Warnakulasuriya Maha Lekumge John Baptist Fernando (born 9 June 1933 – died 1 February 2017 as බැප්ටිස්ට් ප්‍රනාන්දු) [Sinhala]), known popularly as Baptist Fernando, was an actor and producer in Sri Lankan cinema. One of the earliest pillars in Sri Lankan film history, he is best known for playing villains during his more than four decade long career.

Personal life

Fernando was born on 9 June 1933 in Collin Jadiya, Wennappuwa as the eldest of the family. His father's name was Eugene Fernando and mother's name was Winifreda Fernando. He had three younger sisters and two younger brothers. He completed education from Joseph Vaz College, Wennappuwa. He was very good at sports, particularly wrestling, where he practiced wrestling with the then heavyweight champion, Basil Rodrigo. His grandson, Chris Wijewardana, is also an actor who appeared in the television serials Pani Kurullo, Amaliya and the film Apata Sadunu Ape Lokaya.

In 1960 he married Thiris Fernando. The couple had two daughters - Shamila Priyadarshani, Dulari Fernando and on son - Shammi Fernando. His son Shammi was also an actor. In the film Angulimala, which was directed by his father, Shammi played the main role as "Ahinsaka". Then he acted in few films such as Raja Kello, Cheriyo Darling, Alu Yata Gini and Ane Master. Daughter Shamila acted in the teledrama Mangala Seenu. His wife Thiris died in 1986.

He died at the age of 83 on 1 February 2017 while receiving treatments at Ragama hospital. His funeral took place on 3 February 2017 at Borella Cemetery.

Career
One of his schoolmates, S.A. Fernando, took some photographs of Baptist during a church feast. He posted these photos to popular filmmaker B. A. W. Jayamanne. Jayamanne invited Baptist for a screen test at Jayamanne's house "Jaya Ruk Sevana". He was selected for the main antagonist in the 1955 film Perakadoru Bena directed by A.B. Raja. He had to finish senior level class in College to fly India for the shooting. He played two roles in the film - a police officer and villain's henchman.

In 1959, Baptist acted in the film Purusha Rathnaya along with Prem Jayanth. They sang the popular song Aiyata Me Raja Ge Malli Hadala. He continued to receive many villain roles in the following years, including Sithaka Mahima, Ohoma Hondada, Satha Panaha, Sahanaya and Kawuda Raja. In many films, Baptist acted as the villain opposite to Gamini Fonseka who played the protagonist role. He studied cinema in India and met the cinematographer S. Anandan. After he returned to Sri Lanka, Baptist was involved in acting in films along with Anandan. It was only after this that he became a character actor.

In 1972, he co-produced the film Sahanaya with Prem Jayanth under the banner "Seven Arts". Then he produced the film Duppathage Hithawatha and played as the protagonist for the first time. After the film became a blockbuster of that year, Baptist continued to produce many films such as Tikira, Eka diga Kathawak, Namal Renu and Sudu Ayya. The film Eka diga Kathawak was dubbed in Tamil as Oru Thalei Kadal and screened in Jaffna as well. He was known not to sign any agreements with film crew as he was always fluent with paying money on time. In the film Tikira, he introduced back and forth somersault actions to Sinhala cinema. The film was a blockbuster hit as well. It was also Baptist's best-loved film role.

In 1998, he produced and directed the film Angulimala. Then in 1991, he produced the film Raja Kello with Sithara Priyadharshani. Overall he produced 7 films - Sahanaya, Duppathage Hithawatha, Tikira, Eka diga Kathawak, Sudu Ayya, Namal Renu and Angulimala.

Apart from cinema, Baptist also worked as the treasurer of "Nalu Nili Sangamaya".

Filmography

References

External links

2017 deaths
1933 births
Sri Lankan Roman Catholics
Sri Lankan male film actors
Sri Lankan expatriates in India